Trachydora is a genus of moths in the family Cosmopterigidae.

Species
Trachydora acrocyrta (Turner, 1923)
Trachydora acromianta (Turner, 1923)
Trachydora actinia Meyrick, 1897
Trachydora anthrascopa Lower, 1904
Trachydora aphrocoma Meyrick, 1897
Trachydora argoneura Lower, 1904
Trachydora astragalota Meyrick, 1897
Trachydora capnopa (Lower, 1894)
Trachydora centromela Lower, 1904
Trachydora chalybanthes Meyrick, 1897
Trachydora chlorozona Meyrick, 1897
Trachydora chrysodoxa Meyrick, 1915
Trachydora corysta Meyrick, 1897
Trachydora dionysias Meyrick, 1921
Trachydora droserodes Meyrick, 1897
Trachydora fumea (Turner, 1923)
Trachydora heliodora (Lower, 1894)
Trachydora heliotricha (Lower, 1894)
Trachydora illustris Meyrick, 1897
Trachydora iridoptila Meyrick, 1921
Trachydora leucobathra Lower, 1904
Trachydora leucura Meyrick, 1897
Trachydora macrostola (Turner, 1923)
Trachydora microleuca Lower, 1904
Trachydora molybdimera Lower, 1904
Trachydora musaea Meyrick, 1897
Trachydora nomodoxa Meyrick, 1897
Trachydora oxypeuces Turner, 1939
Trachydora oxyzona Meyrick, 1897
Trachydora peroneta Meyrick, 1897
Trachydora placophanes Meyrick, 1897
Trachydora polyzona Lower, 1904
Trachydora porphyrescens (Lower, 1894)
Trachydora psammodes Meyrick, 1897
Trachydora pygaea (Turner, 1923)
Trachydora stephanopa Meyrick, 1897
Trachydora tephronota (Turner, 1923)
Trachydora thyrsophora Meyrick, 1897
Trachydora zophopepla Lower, 1904

References
Natural History Museum Lepidoptera genus database

 
Cosmopterigidae
Moth genera